The lycée Saint-Louis is a highly selective post-secondary school located in the 6th arrondissement of Paris, in the Latin Quarter. It is the only public French lycée exclusively dedicated to providing classes préparatoires aux grandes écoles (CPGE; preparatory classes for the Grandes Écoles such as École Polytechnique, CentraleSupélec in engineering and ESSEC Business School, ESCP Business School, and HEC Paris in commerce). It is known for the quality of its teaching, low acceptance rate and the results it achieves in their intensely competitive entrance examinations (concours). It is widely regarded as one of the best preparatory class in France and one of the most elitist and prestigious along with its neighbours from the Sainte-Geneviève hill the lycée Henri IV and the lycée Louis-Le-Grand.
Saint-Louis has graduated many notable alumni, including five Nobel laureates, one Fields laureate, one President of France, as well as major intellectual figures such as Antoine de Saint-Exupéry, Émile Zola or Louis Pasteur.

History

Collège d'Harcourt 

The lycée Saint-Louis was formerly known as the Collège d'Harcourt. The Collège d'Harcourt was founded in 1280 by Robert and Raoul d'Harcourt to offer food and housing for around forty students from underprivileged backgrounds. Starting from its beginning, it was not only a simple student residence but also a place of teaching, this activity took more and more importance over time. During the Wars of Religion, it was a Catholic stronghold. As a result, Henri IV confiscated the college's property and dismissed its director. Once peace returned, the king reformed the teaching of the colleges: initially intended to train clerics and academics through theological studies, the college was transformed into an institution where the children of the gentry, Parisian bourgeoisie and scholarship holders from Normandy studied.
 
The college started to become famous in the 16th century, and great historical figures such as Racine, Boileau and Perrault attended it in the 17th and 18th centuries.

In the 18th century, it was a stronghold of Jansenists and graduated several of the philosophes and Encyclopédistes of the Enlightenment and therefore opposed the influence of the Jesuits in education, whose stronghold was located couples meter away, at the college of Clermont.

The original building was demolished in 1795 and the present one was built on its site in 1814.

In the course of the tumultuous 19th century, the lycée was successively turned by force into a prison, barracks and reformatory.

Lycée Saint-Louis 

In 1812, a decree of Napoleon I ordered the reopening of the Collège d'Harcourt according to the plans of J.-B. Guynet, in order to accommodate an imperial lycée. However, it was not until October 1820 that the "Collège Royal Saint-Louis" took over from the former Collège d'Harcourt, and welcomed again boarders in 1823. In 1848, following the French Revolution of 1830, it changed its name to "Lycée Saint-Louis", after being called "Lycée Monge " for several months.

The lycée is primarily devoted to the instruction of science (since 1885, the boarding school only welcomed scientific students) and in scientific classes préparatoires aux Grandes Écoles (established in 1866, the only ones present at the school since the closing of the last high school class in 1969). In 1843, a student from the school won the first prize in mathematics for the first time in the concours général. The classes préparatoires aux Grandes Écoles opened in 1866 and allowed students to take the competitive exams for the École polytechnique, the École normale supérieure (in science), Centrale, the École forestière and Saint-Cyr, and were expanded in 1885 to include preparation for the École navale.

A statue of Saint Louis stands in the middle of the central courtyard. According to an old tradition now fully integrated to the school’s folklore, students that have succeeded in getting in Polytechnique have to thank their alma mater by splashing the statue with red or yellow paint depending on whether the year is even or odd. Few days later, the statue is simply painted back white explaining why its traits have become a little bit faded over the years.

Academics

The school offers mainly scientific courses including MPSI (Mathematics, Physics, Engineering), PCSI (Physics, Chemistry and Engineering) for the freshmen, and MP (Mathematics, Physics), PC (Physics, Chemistry), PSI (Physics, Engineering) for seniors as well as BCPST (Biology, Chemistry, Physics, Geology). The lycée has also courses relying heavily on Mathematics and preparing students for the highly selective French Business Schools, they are only intended for students who have completed a scientific Baccalauréat. 
The lycée Saint-Louis, as its neighbors the lycées Louis-le-Grand and Henri IV, commonly known as "the three Lycées of the Sainte-Geneviève hill", is renowned for its selectivity, the quality of its teaching and its results in the various competitive examinations.

Campus
The school has a  library (open until 10:15 p.m. for boarders and day students), a mixed dormitory with 356 beds (234 single rooms, 61 double rooms) and a chapel. It also has a cafeteria, in addition to the dining hall, and classrooms are available to students outside of their normal hours of use.

The campus also has sports facilities: a sports field and two multi-sports gymnasiums (ultimate, basketball, volleyball, badminton, etc.), a gym, a billiard room and a climbing wall. Students have two mandatory hours of sports per week and the sports association allows access to its facilities at noon and in the evening.

Notable alumni

 Claude Allègre - (b. 1937), former Minister, geochemist
 Charles Baudelaire - (1821–1867), writer
 Joseph Bertrand - (1822–1900), mathematician, Academician
 Nicolas Boileau-Despréaux - (1636–1711), writer, Academician
 Patrice de Mac Mahon - (1808-1893), French President 
 Fortuné du Boisgobey - (1821–1891), writer
 Georges Charpak - (1924–2010), physicist, Nobel Prize in Physics 1992
 Emmanuel Chabrier - (1841-1894), composer
 Hubert Curien - (1924–2005), physicist, former Minister of Research
 Denis Diderot - (1713–1784), writer and philosopher
 Charles-François Dupuis - (1742–1809), author
 Pierre-Gilles de Gennes - (1932–2007), physicist, Nobel Prize in Physics 1991
 Charles Gounod - (1818–1893), composer
 Jean-Martin Charcot - (1825–1893), neurologist and professor of anatomical pathology
 Joris-Karl Huysmans - (1848–1907), novelist and art critic
 Eugène Marin Labiche - (1815–1888), dramatist
 Henri Lebesgue - (1875–1941), mathematician
 Montesquieu - (1689–1755), writer and philosopher
 Louis Néel - (1904–2000), physicist, Nobel Prize in Physics 1970
 Louis Pasteur - (1822–1895), chemist and microbiologist, Academician
 Charles Perrault - (1628–1703), writer, Academician
 Jean Racine - (1639–1699), dramatist, Academician
 Alain Robbe-Grillet - (1922–2008), writer and cinematographer, Academician
 Alexandre Rousselin de Saint-Albin - (1773–1847), politician
 Charles de Saint-Évremond - (1613–1703), writer
 Antoine de Saint-Exupéry - (1900–1944), writer and aviator
 Claude Simon - (1913–2005), writer, Nobel Prize in Literature 1985
 Charles Maurice de Talleyrand-Périgord - (1754–1838), statesman
 Yves Tanguy - (1900–1955), surrealist painter
 René Thom - (1923–2002), mathematician, Fields Medal 1958
 Ahmed Vefik Pasha - (1823–1891), Ottoman statesman, diplomat, and playwright
 André Weil - (1906–1998), mathematician
 Émile Zola - (1840–1902), writer
 Jules Massenet - (1842–1912), composer
 Jean-Luc Lagardère - (1928-2003), businessman and founder of Lagardère

Notable teachers
 Maurice Goldring, English professor
 Octave Gréard, academic
 Jacques Hadamard, mathematician
 Léopold Lacour, rhetoric professor, lecturer and playwright

Notes

References
L'ancien collège d'Harcourt et le lycée Saint-Louis, Bouquet, H.L., Paris, Delalin frères, 1891.
Du collège d'Harcourt, 1280, au lycée Saint-Louis, 1980, Fusellier, E., Euvrard, M., Paris, A.P.E. du lycée Saint-Louis, 1980.
Septième centenaire !, Humblot, H., in Bulletin d'information de L'association des parents d'élèves du lycée Saint-Louis. 1978/1979.

External links
 Site of Lycée Saint-Louis (in French)
 History of the lycée (in French)

Colleges of the University of Paris
Saint-Louis
Buildings and structures in the 6th arrondissement of Paris